Richard Green was a Peruvian-American football (soccer) defender who played professionally in Peru and the United States, including the North American Soccer League.  He earned one cap with the U.S. national team in 1973.

Club
Green attended both San Vicente de Paul High School and San Luis Gonzaga High School Teams in Ica, Peru.  He then attended San Luis Gonzaga National University, playing on the school's soccer team.  He began his professional career with Octavio Espinoza de Ica.  Green moved to the United States to play for the Ukrainian Lions, also known as the Chicago Lions, of the National Soccer League (Chicago). He also played for the Italian Maroons, also known as the Chicago Maroons. While playing for the Lions, he was spotted by Bill Foulkes, coach of the Chicago Sting.  Green spent the entire 1976 season with the Sting.  In 1977, he began the season with the Sting before being released and finishing it with the Chicago Cats of the American Soccer League.

International
Green earned one cap with the U.S. national team in a 1-0 win over Poland on August 12, 1973.  He replaced Art Martinich at halftime.  Green, and most of his team mates, were from the lower American divisions after the first division North American Soccer League (NASL) refused to release players for the game.

References

External links
 NASL/ASL stats

1949 births
Living people
Footballers from Lima
Peruvian emigrants to the United States
Peruvian footballers
American soccer players
United States men's international soccer players
American Soccer League (1933–1983) players
Chicago Maroons soccer players
Chicago Sting (NASL) players
National Soccer League (Chicago) players
North American Soccer League (1968–1984) players
Ukrainian Lions players
Association football midfielders